Prospect Harbor is an unincorporated community in the town of Gouldsboro, Hancock County, Maine, United States. Its ZIP code is 04669.

Notes

Unincorporated communities in Hancock County, Maine
Unincorporated communities in Maine